Michael Joseph "Brian" O'Kelly (1915 – October 1982) was an Irish archaeologist who led the excavation and restoration of Newgrange, a major Neolithic passage tomb in the Boyne Valley, County Meath, Ireland, now a UNESCO World Heritage Site.

Early life
O'Kelly was born in Abbeyfeale, County Limerick in 1915. Although he was baptized Michael Joseph, and published as Michael J. or M.J., he was known to family and friends as Brian, the name his mother originally wanted, throughout his life.
He entered University College, Cork in 1934.

He began fieldwork as an undergraduate in 1937. He worked as a surveyor in the excavation of the ring-fort at Garranes, County Cork with Seán P. Ó. Ríordáin, then Professor of Archaeology at Cork. Later that year he moved on to the Neolithic site of Lough Gur.

After receiving his M.A. he was appointed curator of the new Cork Public Museum in Fitzgerald Park. In 1945 he married Claire, also an archaeologist, whom he had met as a student.

Career
In 1946 O'Kelly succeeded Professor Ó Ríordáin as head of the Archaeology Department at Cork, a position he held for 36 years. He led field work each summer, and from 1944 was published extensively in scholarly journals.

Newgrange
Newgrange, the site O'Kelly is most associated with, was originally accidentally discovered in 1699. It was in extremely poor condition in 1961, with no public access. That year the archaeologist Patrick Hartnett selected O'Kelly to direct excavations. Work continued every season through to 1975.

On 21 December 1967 O'Kelly confirmed a local legend that the rays of the sun on the midwinter sunrise go straight through the tomb – passing through a small 'roof-box' opening above the doorway to penetrate along the whole length of the passage as far as the center of the chamber.
O'Kelly speculated: "I think that the people who built Newgrange built not just a tomb but a house of the dead, a house in which the spirits of special people were going to live for a very long time. To ensure this, the builders took special precautions to make sure the tomb stayed completely dry, as it is to this day. …"
O'Kelly and his wife also led work on other sites within the Boyne Valley complex.

Selected bibliography
 Irish Antiquity (1981)
 Newgrange: Archaeology, Art and Legend (1982)
 Early Ireland: An Introduction to Irish Prehistory (1989, posthumous)

Notes

1915 births
1982 deaths
20th-century archaeologists
20th-century Irish people
Irish archaeologists
Academics of University College Cork